Lipinki may refer to:

Lipinki, Bydgoszcz County in Kuyavian-Pomeranian Voivodeship (north-central Poland)
Lipinki, Świecie County in Kuyavian-Pomeranian Voivodeship (north-central Poland)
Lipinki, Biała Podlaska County in Lublin Voivodeship (east Poland)
Lipinki, Chełm County in Lublin Voivodeship (east Poland)
Lipinki, Lesser Poland Voivodeship (south Poland)
Lipinki, Kozienice County in Masovian Voivodeship (east-central Poland)
Lipinki, Wołomin County in Masovian Voivodeship (east-central Poland)
Lipinki, Lubusz Voivodeship (west Poland)
Lipinki, Warmian-Masurian Voivodeship (north Poland)
Lipinki, West Pomeranian Voivodeship (north-west Poland)